Sikorsky or Sikorski may refer to:
 Sikorsky (comics), a Marvel Comics character
 Sikorsky (crater), a lunar crater
 Sikorsky Aircraft, an American aircraft manufacturer

People with the surname
 Brian Sikorski (born 1974), Major League Baseball and Nippon Professional Baseball relief pitcher
 Daniel Sikorski (born 1987), Austrian footballer
 Igor Sikorsky (1889–1972), Russian-American inventor and founder of the Sikorsky Aircraft Corporation
 Kazimierz Sikorski (1895–1986), Polish composer
 Krystian Sikorski, Polish ice hockey player
 Radosław Sikorski (born 1963), Polish Minister of Foreign Affairs, former Minister of National Defence
 Roman Sikorski (1920–1983), Polish mathematician
 Władysław Sikorski (1881–1943), Polish general and Prime Minister in exile during World War II

Fictional
 Rudolf Sikorski, a character in Boris and Arkady Strugatsky's series of novels

See also
 Sikorski
 Hans Sikorski, a music publishing house in Hamburg, Germany
 Polish Institute and Sikorski Museum, a museum in London,

Polish-language surnames